Monash University is a public research university based in Melbourne, Victoria, Australia. Named after prominent World War I general Sir John Monash, it was founded in 1958 and is the second oldest university in the state. The university has a number of campuses, four of which are in Victoria (Clayton, Caulfield, Peninsula, and Parkville), and one in Malaysia. Monash also has a research and teaching centre in Prato, Italy, a graduate research school in Mumbai, India and graduate schools in Suzhou, China and Tangerang, Indonesia. Monash University courses are also delivered at other locations, including South Africa.

Monash is home to major research facilities, including the Monash Law School, the Australian Synchrotron, the Monash Science Technology Research and Innovation Precinct (STRIP), the Australian Stem Cell Centre, Victorian College of Pharmacy, and 100 research centres and 17 co-operative research centres. In 2019, its total revenue was over $2.72 billion (AUD), with external research income around $462 million. In 2019, Monash enrolled over 55,000 undergraduate and over 25,000 graduate students. It has more applicants than any other university in the state of Victoria.

Monash is a member of Australia's Group of Eight research universities, a member of the ASAIHL, and is the only Australian member of the M8 Alliance of Academic Health Centers, Universities and National Academies. Monash is one of the Australian universities to be ranked in the École des Mines de Paris (Mines ParisTech) ranking on the basis of the number of alumni listed among CEOs in the 500 largest worldwide companies.

History

Early history: 1950s
Established  by  an  Act of Parliament in 1958, the original campus was in the suburb of Clayton   where the university was granted an expansive site of 100 hectares of open land. The 100 hectares of land consisted of farmland and included the  former Talbot Epileptic Colony.  The   Tudor-style farmhouse built  by  the  O'Shea family  became  the   original  Vice-Chancellor's House -  now  University  House.

From its first intake of 357 students at Clayton on 13 March 1961, the university grew rapidly in size and student numbers so that by 1967, it had enrolled more than 21,000 students since its establishment. In its early years, it offered undergraduate and postgraduate degrees in engineering, medicine, science, arts, economics, politics, education, and law. It was a major provider for international student places under the Colombo Plan, which saw the first Asian students enter the Australian education system.

In its early years of teaching, research and administration, Monash did not have entrenched traditional practices, and as such, Monash was able to adopt modern approaches without significant resistance. A modern administrative structure was set up; Australia's first research centres and scholarships devoted to Indigenous Australians were established.

The university was named after the prominent Australian general Sir John Monash. This was the first time in Australia that a university had been named after a person, rather than a city or state.

1970s onwards
From the mid-1960s to the early 1970s, Monash became the centre of student radicalism in Australia. It was the site of many mass student demonstrations, particularly concerning Australia's role in Vietnam War and conscription. By the late 1960s, several student organisations, some of which were influenced by or supporters of communism, turned their focus to Vietnam, with numerous blockades and sit-ins. In one extraordinary event that came to be known as the Monash Siege, students forced then Prime Minister Malcolm Fraser to hide in a basement at the Alexander Theatre, in a major protest over the Whitlam dismissal.

In the late 1970s and 1980s, some of Monash's most publicised research came through its pioneering of in-vitro fertilisation (IVF). Led by Carl Wood and Alan Trounson, the Monash IVF Program achieved the world's first clinical IVF pregnancy in 1973. In 1980, they delivered the first IVF baby in Australia. This eventually became a massive source of revenue for the university at a time when university funding in Australia was beginning to slow down.

In the late 1980s, the Dawkins Reforms changed the landscape of higher education in Australia. Under the leadership of Vice-Chancellor Mal Logan, Monash transformed dramatically. In 1988, Monash University had only one campus in Clayton, with around 15,000 students. Just over a decade later, it had 8 campuses (including 2 overseas), a European research and teaching centre, and more than 50,000 students, making it the largest and most internationalised Australian university.

Expansion in the 1990s
Expansion of the university began in 1990 with a series of mergers between Monash, the Chisholm Institute of Technology, and the Gippsland Institute of Advanced Education. In 1991 a merger with the Victorian College of Pharmacy created a new faculty of the university. This continued in 1994, with the establishment of the Berwick campus.

In 1998, the university opened the Malaysia campus, its first overseas campus and the first foreign university in Malaysia. In 2001, Monash South Africa opened its doors in Johannesburg, making Monash the first foreign university in South Africa. The same year, the university secured an 18th-century Tuscan palace to open a research and teaching centre in Prato, Italy.

At the same time, Australian universities faced unprecedented demand for international student places, which Monash met on a larger scale than most. Today, around 30% of its students are from outside Australia. Monash students come from over 100 countries, and speak over 90 different languages. The increase in international students, combined with the university's expansion, meant that Monash's income greatly increased throughout the 1990s, and it is now one of Australia's top 200 exporters.

2000 onwards
 

In recent years, the university has been prominent in medical research. A highlight of this came in 2000, when Alan Trounson led the team of scientists which announced to the world that nerve stem cells could be derived from embryonic stem cells, a discovery which led to a dramatic increase in interest in the potential of stem cells. It has also led to Monash being ranked in the top 20 universities in the world for biomedicine.

On 21 October 2002 Huan Yun "Allen" Xiang, shot two people dead and injured five others on the Clayton campus.

Since December 2011, Monash has had a global alliance with the University of Warwick in the United Kingdom.

In 2014, the university ceded its Gippsland campus to Federation University. On 15 July 2016, Monash confirmed that Federation University Australia would take over the operations of the Berwick campus prior to the end of 2018.

In 2019, the university sold its Monash South Africa campus to Advtech. Students who were on schedule to complete their degree on time would still receive a degree from Monash University after the sale. The reason for the sale was reported low profitability and enrollment numbers. Prior to the sale, Monash University had sidelined the South African campus on its official websites and did not refer to it as a 'campus' unlike Monash Malaysia.

Monash announced its second Southeast Asian expansion in Indonesia as it officially obtained its operational license from the Ministry of Education and Culture on 1 December 2020. The university plans to open its campus doors in October 2021, located in BSD City, Tangerang, Banten. Unlike Monash Malaysia, Monash Indonesia will focus on graduate studies.

Campuses

Australia

Clayton

The Clayton campus covers an area over 1.1 km2 and is the largest of the Monash campuses. Clayton is the flagship campus for Monash, demanding higher ATAR (Australian Tertiary Admission Rank) scores than all the other campuses, with the exception of Parkville. Clayton is home to the faculties of Arts, Business & Economics, Education, Engineering, IT, Law, Medicine, Nursing and Health Sciences, Pharmaceutical Science and Science. The Clayton campus has its own suburb and postcode (3800).

Various major scientific research facilities are located on or adjacent to the campus. Chief among these are the Australian Synchrotron and CSIRO.

The campus is also home to numerous restaurants and retail outlets, as well as student bars Sir John's (located in the Campus Centre) and the Notting Hill Hotel (located down the street, founded in 1891), both of which are hubs of social life on the campus.

The campus is also home to a number of halls of residence, colleges and other on-campus accommodation that house several thousand students. Six halls of residence are located at the Clayton campus in Clayton, Victoria. There is an additional private residential college affiliated with the university. The Clayton campus contains the Robert Blackwood Hall, named after the university's founding chancellor Sir Robert Blackwood and designed by Sir Roy Grounds.

Caulfield

The Caulfield campus is Monash University's second-largest. Its multifaceted nature is reflected in the range of programs it offers through the faculties of Arts, Art Design & Architecture (MADA), Business & Economics, Information Technology and Medicine, and Nursing and Health Sciences. A major building program has been announced to expand teaching facilities, provide student accommodation, and redevelop the shopping centre.

The Alfred
Located in The Alfred Hospital, Monash University's Alfred campus houses the Central Clinical School and the School of Public Health and Preventive Medicine, which contains the Department of Epidemiology and Preventive Medicine and the Department of Forensic Medicine.

Parkville
The Parkville campus is located on Royal Parade in the Melbourne suburb of Parkville, around 2 km north of the Melbourne CBD. The campus is home to the Faculty of Pharmacy and Pharmaceutical Sciences. The faculty specialises in pharmacy practice, pharmaceutical and formulation science, and medicinal chemistry. The campus offers Australia's first combined, 5-year Bachelor of Pharmacy/Master of Pharmacy program, leading to registration as a pharmacist after successful completion of a supervised internship and registration exams in the final year. The Bachelor of Pharmaceutical Science replaced the Bachelor of Formulation Science in 2007 and the Bachelor of Medicinal Chemistry in 2008. High achieving students may enrol in a double degree, combining a Bachelor of Engineering and a Bachelor of Pharmaceutical Science. The campus also offers postgraduate degrees, including the Doctor of Philosophy and Master of Clinical Pharmacy.

Considered a world-class faculty, it was ranked first in the world in pharmacy and pharmacology in the 2022 QS World University Rankings by Subject, surpassing Harvard University and the University of Oxford, which ranked second and third, respectively.

Peninsula
The Peninsula campus has a teaching and research focus on health and wellbeing, and is a hub of undergraduate and postgraduate studies in Nursing, Health Science, Physiotherapy, Occupational Therapy and Psychology – and particularly in Emergency Health (Paramedic) courses.

The campus is located in the bayside suburb of Frankston on the edge of Melbourne.

Peninsula campus also offers a range of courses including those from its historic roots with early childhood and primary education (during the 1960s and 1970s the campus was the State Teachers' College), and Business & Economics (since the merger of the State Teachers' College with the Caulfield Institute of Technology to create the Chisholm Institute of Technology in 1982). The campus was also home to the Peninsula School of Information Technology, which in 2006 was wound back with Information Technology units previously offered being relocated to the Caulfield campus.

City
The centrally located Monash Law City Campus houses the postgraduate Faculty of Law. It provides teaching for the Monash Law Masters and JD programmes.

International

Malaysia

The Monash University Malaysia campus opened in 1998 in Bandar Sunway, Selangor, Malaysia. The Sunway campus offers various undergraduate degrees through its faculties of Arts and Social Sciences, Business, Engineering, Information Technology, Medicine and Health Sciences, Pharmacy and Science. It is currently home to over 8,489  students.
The new purpose-built campus opened in 2007, providing a high-tech home for Monash in Malaysia. In addition to a wide range of undergraduate degrees, the campus also offers both postgraduate Masters and PhD programs. Its degrees in Medicine and Surgery are the first medical degrees outside Australia and New Zealand to be accredited by the Australian Medical Council.

Italy

The Monash University Prato Centre is located in the 18th-century palace, Palazzo Vaj, in the historic centre of Prato, a city near Florence in Italy. Primarily, it hosts staff and students from Monash's other campuses for semesters in Law, Art Design & Architecture, History, Music, and Criminology as well as various international conferences. It was officially opened on 17 September 2001 as part of the university's vigorous internationalisation policy.

India
The IITB-Monash Research Academy opened in 2008 and is situated in Mumbai, India. It is a partnership between Monash and the Indian Institute of Technology Bombay. It aims to carry out high impact research in engineering and sciences, particularly clean energy, biotechnology and nanotechnology. Students undertake their research in both India and Australia, with supervisors from both Monash and IITB. Upon graduating, they receive a dual PhD from the two institutions. In the month following its official opening, 36 joint projects had commenced, with a further several hundred planned.

In August 2015 Christopher Pyne, Australian Minister for Education and Training, officially opened the new Monash-IITB Research Academy Building in Mumbai, India.

Suzhou, China
In 2012, it was announced that Monash had won a licence to develop a joint graduate school with Southeast University (Nanjing) in Suzhou, Jiangsu Province. The Southeast University-Monash University Joint Graduate School is the first Australian university, and the third foreign university, to win a licence to operate in China. The school offers master's degrees and PhDs in science and engineering, with an initial cohort of 500 students, building up to 2000 in the years to come.

Indonesia

The Monash University Indonesia will open its doors in October 2021, focusing on offering master's degree and PhDs in Data Science, Urban Design, Business Innovation, and Public Policy & Management. The planned campus is located in BSD City, Tangerang, Banten.

Former campuses

Gippsland
As part of the university's expansion in the 1990s, Monash took over the operations of the Gippsland Institute of Advanced Education in 1990. The commitment to regional higher education on the part of the university was a progressive and bold step, however, the operation of the Gippsland campus was always fraught with some tension between the priorities of the metropolitan-centred campuses at Clayton and Caulfield versus the needs and aspirations of the regional one.

The Gippsland campus was designed in order to provide courses via distance education. Between 2005 and 2010, many of these programs were transferred to city campuses, thus losing their appeal to regional areas. At its peak enrolment in 2007, the campus was home to 2,000 on-campus students, 5,000 off-campus students and nearly 400 staff. The campus sits in the Latrobe Valley town of Churchill, 142 km east of Melbourne on 63 hectares of landscaped grounds. Until 2014 it was the only non-metropolitan campus of Monash University. The campus offered many undergraduate degrees, attracting students from the Latrobe Valley, East and West Gippsland.

Ballarat University joined with Monash University Gippsland campus to form a new regional university known as Federation University Australia from 1 January 2014. As of that date, Monash began the process of teaching out its courses at Gippsland with only a medical school presence to remain after the merger.

Berwick
The former Berwick campus of Monash University was built on the old Casey airfield in the south-eastern growth corridor of Victoria, Australia. The town of Berwick has experienced an influx of people and development in recent times, which includes the new campus of Monash University. With a presence in the area since 1994, the first Monash Berwick campus building was completed in 1996 and the third building in March 2004. It was situated on a 55-hectare site in the City of Casey, then one of the three fastest growing municipalities in Australia. Monash announced the closure of this campus to staff and students on 7 March 2016. On 15 July 2016 it was announced that Federation University Australia would take responsibility for the Berwick Campus from 2017 pending government approvals. This officially commenced on 1 January 2018, as a campus of Federation University Australia.

South Africa
In August 2013 Monash University announced it had entered a partnership that will enable its South African presence to grow and enhance its educational offering. The partnership is with Laureate International Universities.

Monash and Laureate finalised terms to transfer ownership of the campus to the Independent Institute of Education (IIE) South Africa in 2015. The transfer was concluded in 2019.

Organisation and governance

Faculties
Monash is divided into 10 faculties. These incorporate the university's major departments of teaching and research centres.

The faculties are:

 Faculty of Art Design & Architecture (MADA)
 Faculty of Arts
 Faculty of Business and Economics
 Faculty of Education
 Faculty of Engineering
 Faculty of Information Technology
 Faculty of Law
 Faculty of Medicine, Nursing and Health Sciences
 Faculty of Pharmacy and Pharmaceutical Sciences
 Faculty of Science

Various other academic organisations exist alongside the faculties and research centres. Monash College provides students with an alternative point of entry to Monash University. The institution offers pathway studies for students who endeavour to undertake studies at one of Monash's campuses. The college's specialised undergraduate diplomas (Diploma Part 2 is equivalent to first-year university) provide an alternative entry point into more than 60 Monash University bachelor degrees, taught intensively in smaller classes and an environment overall similar to that offered by the university. Monash College offers programs in several countries throughout the world, with colleges located in Australia, China, Malaysia, India, Italy and South Africa.

Vice-chancellors and chancellors
The vice-chancellor is the chief executive of the university, who is head of Monash's day-to-day activities. The vice-chancellor is also the university president of Monash. In North America and parts of Europe, the equivalent role is the president or principal. The current vice-chancellor and president is Margaret Gardner. She was named as the vice-chancellor and president on 1 September 2014, who is the first woman to hold the position.

The chancellor is chair of the university council and provides advice to the vice-chancellor, as well as having ceremonial duties.

Academia

Admissions
The Good Universities Guide places the Clayton, Caulfield, Parkville and Peninsula campuses of Monash in the category of universities most difficult to gain admission to in Australia for domestic students, with each campus receiving an Entry Standards mark of 5/5. Monash has the highest demand for places among domestic high school graduates of any Australian university in Victoria. In 2009, one in four applicants put Monash as their first preference. This equates to more than 15,000 first preferences from Victorian high school leavers. Of the top 5% of high school graduates in Victoria, more choose Monash than any other institution. In 2010, almost half of the top 5% of high school leavers chose to attend Monash – the highest of any Victorian university by quite some margin. In 2009, among students with a "perfect" ENTER score of 99.95 (i.e. students in the top 0.05% of high school applicants), 63 made an application for Monash.

Rankings

Monash is consistently ranked among the world's top 55–70 universities in the QS World University Rankings. In 2022, QS World ranked Monash University 1st globally for Pharmacy & Pharmacology.

Research
Monash University staff produce over 3,000 research publications each year, with research conducted in over 150 fields of study.

Monash is home to over 120 research centres and institutes. Major interdisciplinary research centres include the Monash Biomedicine Discovery Institute, the Monash University Accident Research Centre and the Monash Centre for Synchrotron Science. Some notable research centres also located at or affiliated with Monash University include the Australian Regenerative Medicine Institute, the Castan Centre for Human Rights Law, the Melbourne Centre for Nanofabrication and the Monash Institute of Medical Research.

Some of the university's notable research achievements include the world's first IVF pregnancy, the first seatbelt legislation, the discovery of the anti-influenza drug Relenza (Zanamivir), the discovery that nerve stem cells could be derived from embryonic stem cells and the development of a single-use oral anti-malaria drug.

Collections

Library
Monash University Library currently operates several libraries at all of its campuses, spanning over three continents. The library has over 3.2 million items.

Rare books collection
Located at the Sir Louis Matheson Library on the Clayton Campus, the Rare Books Collection consists of over 100,000 items, valued because of their age, uniqueness or physical beauty, which can be accessed by Monash staff and students. The collection was started in 1961 when the university librarian purchased original manuscripts by Jonathan Swift and some of his contemporaries. The collection now consists of a range of items including photography, children's books, 15th- to 17th-century English and French literature, original manuscripts and pamphlets. A variety of exhibitions are hosted throughout the year in the Rare Books area.

Monash University Museum of Art

The Monash University Museum of Art (MUMA), since 2010 based on the Caulfield Campus, is the end result of an initiative started in 1961, when the inaugural Vice Chancellor Louis Matheson created a fund for the purchase of artworks by then living Australian artists. The establishment of the museum reflected a desire by the university's founders to create the modern Australian university, and to enrich the cultural life of students, staff and visitors.

In 1975, the Monash University Gallery was created in the Menzies Building, moving in 1987 to the Multi-Discipline Centre (later called the Gallery Building).

Its collection had grown to over 1500 works by 2008, including artworks by Arthur Boyd, William Dobell, Sidney Nolan, Howard Arkley, Tracey Moffatt, John Perceval, Fred Williams and Bill Henson. While the gallery's focus is on contemporary Australian art, it houses a number of international works and exhibitions. It hosts regular exhibitions which are open to Monash students and staff, as well as the general public.

 the curator is Charlotte Day, while the advisory committee is chaired by Dean Shane Murray and includes Louise Adler and Maudie Palmer AO, founding director  of the TarraWarra Museum of Art and Heide Museum of Modern Art.

Switchback Gallery

The Switchback Gallery was opened in 1995 in the landscaped gardens of the university's Gippsland Campus. It hosts a diverse range of exhibitions each year, from work by Monash students, to displays by international artists.

MADA Gallery

Known as the Faculty Gallery between 1999 and 2012, the MADA Gallery is a contemporary art gallery located at the university's Caulfield Campus. It is used as a teaching aid for the benefit of the students and staff from the faculty as well as the wider community, and is open to the public. The gallery exhibits solo and group shows by academic and professional staff, local, interstate and international artists and curators, and also hosts artist in residency programs.

Japanese Studies Centre Manga Library
Located at the university's Clayton Campus, the Manga Library was established in 2002 as a part of the Japanese Studies Centre. The Manga Library houses over 7000 volumes of Japanese manga, spanning a diverse range of genres including Shounen, Shoujo, Seinen and manga classics. The Manga Library's collection also includes volumes translated into English as well as a selection of bilingual manga. The Manga Library is entirely volunteer-run.

Student life

Student body
In 2011 Monash had over 63,000 students across its campuses. Of these, around 46,000 are undergraduate students, 12,500 are graduate or postgraduate and 4,500 are undertaking higher degrees by research.

Around 65% of Monash students have domestic citizenship (i.e. they are citizens of the country in which their main campus is located). Around 39% are international students. The international students are from over 100 countries and speak around 90 different languages. Over 50% of Monash students have a language other than English as their mother language.

Student organisations
Monash students are represented by student unions in individual campus organisations. Graduate students are represented by the university-wide Monash Graduate Association, while undergraduate students are represented by:
 Monash Student Association (MSA) – Clayton Campus
 Monash Student Union Caulfield (MONSU Caulfield) – Caulfield Campus
 Monash Parkville Student Union (MPSU) – Parkville Campus
 Monash Student Union Peninsula (MONSU Peninsula) – Peninsula Campus
 Monash University Student Association (MUSA) – Malaysia campus

Monash students are also represented by academic associations and societies. These groups organise social events and represent student interests to the faculty among other goals.

Apart from the representative organisations, Monash has numerous other interest-based clubs and societies. Some notable student organisations include:
 Lot's Wife - A newspaper for the Clayton Campus
 Monash Association of Debaters
 Monash Whites Football Club

Sport

Sport at Monash University is overseen by Monash Sport, a department of the university which employs over 200 staff. Currently, there are over 50 sporting clubs at the university.

Each campus has a range of sporting facilities used by students and staff, including football, cricket, hockey, soccer, rugby and baseball fields; tennis, squash and badminton courts; gyms and swimming pools. The university also had an alpine lodge at Mount Buller until the end of 2011.

Monash's sporting teams compete in a range of local and national competitions. Monash sends the largest number of students of any Australian university to the Australian University Games, in which it was Overall Champion in 2008 and 2009.

Facilities at Monash are often used by a range of professional sporting teams. For example, the Australia national association football team, the Socceroos, used the Clayton campus and trained on-site in South Africa for the 2010 FIFA World Cup.

Colleges and halls of residence
Monash Residential Services (MRS) is responsible for co-ordinating the operation of on-campus halls of residence. MRS manages a variety of facilities on campus at Clayton and Peninsula:

Mannix College, founded in 1969 and owned by the Catholic Church was originally an all-male college administered by the Dominican order. Mannix is affiliated with the University.

Marist College, founded by the Marist order, was established in November 1969 as a traditional all-male college, with an attached seminary. Marist College had closed by 1978, the university subsequently purchasing the college and naming it Normanby House.

The Gippsland campus had on-campus accommodation including the self-catering West House and East House.

In 2013, Monash University introduced Non-Residential Colleges. There are now eight colleges: Orion, Centaurus and Ursa (Clayton campus), Pegasus, Phoenix and Auriga (Caulfield campus), Aquila (Peninsula campus), and Lupa (Caulfield and Parkville campuses).

History of Monash Clayton halls of residences and colleges
 Deakin Hall was officially opened in September 1962 and was Australia's first co-educational University residence hall  - although the women and men were housed on separate floors. The hall consists of two wings - Old Deakin and New Deakin - which form a large courtyard. Old Deakin contained the hall's Dining Hall which operated for some years before a nearby separate central dining building complex was built c. 1966. The new complex housed individual dining rooms for Deakin Hall, Farrer Hall and Howitt Hall which were all linked via a common kitchen. Deakin Hall was named after Alfred Deakin, Prime Minister from 1903 to 1910 and father of the Australian Constitution.
 Howitt Hall is the tallest Monash residential building, standing 12 stories high, with a good view of the other halls and the university. As with Deakin Hall, Farrer Hall, Roberts Hall, Richardson Hall and Normanby House,  Howitt Hall is a traditional hall of residence. It is the third oldest hall, and was opened in September 1966. The hall is named after Alfred Howitt, a scholar and prominent figure in early Gippsland.
 Farrer Hall was officially opened in 1965. It is divided into two buildings, Commons and Lords, with an annexe to Commons called Chastity which is located above the common room. The hall's design, like that of Deakin Hall, Howitt Hall and Normanby House, is traditional, with corridors on each floor and kitchens, laundries and common rooms shared across them. The hall was named after William Farrer, who developed many strains of wheat suited to Australian conditions.
 Richardson Hall (Richo) was established in 1972. The hall was designed with stairwells rather than corridors, and originally had its own dining hall.  Richardson is home to 190 residents. The hall is named after Ethel Florence Lindesay Richardson, a prominent Australian author who adopted the male pseudonym Henry Handel Richardson.
 Roberts Hall is named after Tom Roberts, an Australian artist who was affectionately known as "the bulldog". Founded in 1971, the hall was designed with stairwells rather than corridors, and originally had its own dining hall. The hall's mascot is a bulldog in recognition of the nickname of its namesake - Tom Roberts. Built at the same time as Richardson Hall sharing the same primary buildings but opening the year previous. 
 Jackomos Hall and Briggs Hall are twin residences which opened in 2012. They are named after two prominent Indigenous women, Merle Jackomos and Geraldine Briggs.
 Campbell Hall, Holman Hall, Logan Hall and Turner Hall are the most recently built halls at Monash Clayton campus and consist of self-contained studio apartments.
 Normanby House was first established as Marist College. It was founded by the Marist order and was established in November 1969 as a traditional all-male college, with an attached seminary. Marist College had closed by 1978, the university subsequently purchasing the college and naming it Normanby House.
 Mannix College is a Catholic residential college affiliated with Monash, located near the south-western corner of the university's Clayton campus. Established in 1969, the college was originally an all-male foundation. Mannix's college motto "Omnia Omnibus" means "All things to all People". The shield of Mannix College combines elements of Archbishop Daniel Mannix - after whom the college was named - Sir John Monash and the Dominican Order. From the shield of Mannix the gryphon and crescents are taken together with the motto. The shield of Sir John Monash, used by the university named after him, shows the inverted chevron, the Southern Cross, the open book and sword in pale blue surrounded by a crown of laurel. The black-and-white border is drawn from the shield of the Dominican Order. The college was co-educational by the mid-1970s.

Notable alumni and staff

Alumni
There are 1,100 Monash graduates (or 8.33% of the total biographical listings) listed among the 13,200 biographies of Australia's most notable individuals in the 2008 edition of Who's Who in Australia. Likewise, 10% of Australia's top 50 CEOs completed their undergraduate degree at Monash.

Notable graduates in politics include: Bill Shorten, former Australian Leader of the Opposition; Daniel Andrews, Premier of Victoria; Richard Di Natale, Leader of the Australian Greens; Josh Frydenberg, Treasurer of Australia; Senator for Victoria; Adam Bandt, Australian Greens Member of Parliament for Melbourne; Anna Burke, former Speaker of the Australian House of Representatives; Boediono, Vice President of Indonesia; Simon Crean, former cabinet member in the Rudd Government and Gillard Government; David de Kretser, former Governor of Victoria; Lim Guan Eng, former Minister of Finance, Malaysia; Robert Doyle, former Lord Mayor of Melbourne and Marlene Moses, United Nations Ambassador for Nauru.

Graduates in scientific fields include: Alan Finkel, Chief Scientist of Australia; Ian Meredith, Global Chief Medical Officer and Executive Vice President, Boston Scientific; Tim Flannery, scientist, ecology activist; Brad McKay, doctor, author and television personality; Tilman Ruff, founding chair of International Campaign to Abolish Nuclear Weapons, infectious diseases and public health physician and Ranjana Srivastava, oncologist and author.

Graduates in entertainment include: Doug Chappel, comedian and actor; David Williamson, playwright; Andrew Daddo, actor, author, and television personality; Charlie Pickering, TV host and comedian; Vance Joy, singer-songwriter.

Graduates in other fields include: Peter Costello, businessman, political commentator and longest-serving Treasurer of Australia; Ian MacFarlane, economist, Governor of the Reserve Bank of Australia (1996–2006); George Pell, Australian Cardinal of the Catholic Church; Anne Ferguson, Chief Justice of Victoria and Marilyn Warren, 11th and first female Chief Justice of Victoria.

Staff
Notable current staff members at Monash include: Waleed Aly, TV presenter; Kate Burridge, linguist; John Brumby, former Premier of Victoria; Ken Coghill, former Speaker of the Parliament of Victoria; Michael Cowley, physiologist; Raymond Finkelstein, former Justice of the Federal Court of Australia; George Hampel, former Justice of the Supreme Court of Victoria; Constant Mews, authority on early Medieval thought; Yew-Kwang Ng, economist; Ann Nicholson, computer scientist; Graeme Pearman, climate change scientist; Jessica Borger, T-cell immunologist; Megan Burslem, radio presenter and music educator; Andrew Prentice, mathematician; Kathy Temin, artist; John Thwaites, environmentalist, former Deputy Premier of Victoria; Christopher Weeramantry, judge and former Vice-President of the International Court of Justice; Burkard Polster, mathematician and mathematics communicator.

See also 

 List of universities in Australia
 John Monash Science School
 Monash University Regiment

Notes

References

Further reading

 Sir Robert Blackwood, Monash University: the first ten years, Melbourne, Hampden Hall, 1968
 Simon Marginson, Monash: Remaking the University, Allen & Unwin, 2000
 Sir Louis Matheson, Still learning, South Melbourne, Macmillan, 1980
 Monash University, Go Boldly: Monash University, Clayton, Monash University, 2008
 Janette Bomford, Victorian College of Pharmacy: 125 years of history, 1881–2006
 H.V. Feehan, Birth of the Victorian College of Pharmacy
 Louise Gray and Karen Stephens, Victorian College of Pharmacy: 125 stories for 125 years, 1881–2006
 Geoffrey Hutton, The Victorian College of Pharmacy: an observer's view
 Sarah Rood, From Ferranti to Faculty: Information Technology at Monash University, 1960 to 1990, Monash University Custom Publishing Service, 2008
 Victorian College of Pharmacy, The Search for a partner : a history of the amalgamation of the Victorian College of Pharmacy and Monash University
 Fay Woodhouse, Still learning: a 50 year history of Monash University Peninsula Campus, Clayton, Monash University, 2008
 Graeme Davison & Kate Murphy, University Unlimited: The Monash Story, Allen & Unwin, 2012

External links
 
 Monash University Museum of Art
 Monash University Publishing

 
1958 establishments in Australia
Educational institutions established in 1958
Universities established in the 1950s
Universities in Melbourne
Group of Eight (Australian universities)